Nurjahan Murshid (22 May 1924 – 1 September 2003) was a journalist and teacher, a Bangladesh cabinet minister, and social activist.

Personal life
Murshid was born as Noorjahan Beg in Taranagar, Murshidabad, on 22 May 1924. She married Khan Sarwar Murshid in 1948. They had four children: economist Khan Ahmed Sayeed Murshid, historian Tazeen Murshid, Sharmeen Murshid, and Kumar Murshid

Education 
The fourth of seven daughters of Janab Ayub Hussain Beg and Bibi Khatimunnessa, she received her early schooling at home under her father, chief of police, daroga, in Lalgola, Murshidabad, under the British Police Service, and later under her paternal uncle Professor Husam Uddin Beg, who was the Principal of B M College in Barisal of East Bengal. She finished her secondary education with a first division at Victoria Institution, Calcutta.  She received a master's degree in history from Calcutta University,

Work

She was a broadcaster for All India Radio. Notably, she was the first Muslim woman to work for this establishment.
In East Pakistan, Murshid continued to work for the media, broadcasting for Radio Pakistan and rising to become a programme producer that brought her into contact with figures such as Shamsul Huda, Laila Arjumand Banu, Laila Samad, and Kamal Lohani. She became Principal of Syedunnesa Girls' High School in Barisal, and later taught at various institutions in Dhaka, such as Quamrunnessa School, Viqarunnisa Noon School and College and Holy Cross College.

Murshid was one of two women to be directly elected to the Provincial Legislative Assembly of East Bengal in 1954 on a United Front ticket.  As an accredited deputy of the Mujibnagar Government in exile she sought the recognition of Bangladesh from the Indian government, essentially to raise support for the Bangladesh Liberation war. That prompted the Pakistani military junta to sentence her to 14 years rigorous imprisonment in absentia. In independent Bangladesh, she was appointed in 1972 as state minister for health and social welfare in the cabinet of Sheikh Mujibur Rahman. She was elected to the country's first parliament in 1973. She left politics after the assassination of Sheikh Mujibur Rahman and the jail killings of four key cabinet ministers, including Tajuddin Ahmed, prime minister of Bangladesh in exile, and Syed Nazrul Islam, former acting president of Bangladesh, in exile in 1975.

In 1985, she brought out a Bangla periodical called Ekal and became its editor. Later renamed Edesh Ekal, it focused not just on the problems of women, but also explored various social and political issues that confronted Bangladesh, including violence, representation, corruption and democratic deficit. Among her notable contributions to the journal were a series of interviews of personalities like the writer Nirad Choudhury, once the personal secretary of A. K. Fazlul Huq of the Krishak Proja Party, poet Shamsur Rahman and painter Quamrul Hassan, who incidentally had illustrated the cover page of her journal. The journal folded in 1991, due in part to financial constraints and in part to weariness that was multiplied by the hardship faced by the middle classes after the big floods of 1988, wrote Noorjehan.

She was the first President of the Bangladesh Mahila Samity, the founder President of Azimpur Ladies Club, the founder of Agrani Balika Bidyalay, a founder member of Birdem Diabetic Clinic, a sponsor of Ain-o-Shalish Kendra at its infancy, the founder of Sreyoshi, a club for the wives of Dhaka University teachers. Notably, the request of the ladies to seal one of the entrances to the university compound and its subsequent accomplishment saved the life of Noor and her family on 26 March 1971 at the start of Operation Searchlight. She was the first Bengali Muslim woman to act on stage in East Pakistan in 1949.

Death
Murshid was diagnosed with cancer in 2002, and died on 1 September 2003 in Dhaka.

References

1924 births
2003 deaths
Bangladeshi women academics
University of Calcutta alumni
Recipients of the Ekushey Padak
Women members of the Jatiya Sangsad
Women government ministers of Bangladesh
20th-century Bangladeshi women politicians
State Ministers of Health and Family Welfare (Bangladesh)